The 2012 AFC Challenge Cup was the fourth edition of the tournament, an international football competition for Asian Football Confederation (AFC) member nations that are mainly categorized as "emerging countries" in the defunct Vision Asia programme.  It took place in Nepal from 8–19 March 2012.  Unlike in previous editions of the tournament, there were no automatic qualifiers. Therefore, 2010 champions North Korea, runners-up Turkmenistan, and third-placed Tajikistan had to navigate the qualification phase in order to return to the finals.  North Korea successfully defended their title and qualified for the 2015 AFC Asian Cup.

Hosts
Maldives, Nepal, and Palestine expressed an interest to bid to host the tournament.  A decision on which country would be hosts was set to be made by the Asian Football Confederation (AFC) on 14 June 2011, but was deferred until the AFC Executive Committee on 29 July 2011. The committee decided to endorse Nepal as the hosts of the AFC Challenge Cup 2012 Finals.

Venues

Qualification

The qualification stage saw 20 eligible member associations compete in qualifiers.

 An initial pre-qualifying round (home and away) narrowed the field to 16 teams.
 The final qualifying round consist of four groups of four teams each with the group winners and runners-up qualifying.
 Only the eight teams that qualified for the tournament finals were permitted to bid to be hosts.

Qualified nations
  – Qualification Group A winners
  – Qualification Group A runners-up
  – Qualification Group B winners
  – Qualification Group B runners-up
  – Qualification Group C winners
  – Qualification Group C runners-up
  – Qualification Group D winners
  – Qualification Group D runners-up

Draw
The draw for the final tournament was held on 1 December 2011 at the Soaltee Crown Plaza Hotel in Kathmandu, Nepal.

Squads

Each team could name a squad of 23 players.

Group stage
All times are Nepal Time (NPT) – UTC+5:45

Tie-breaking criteria
The teams are ranked according to points (3 points for a win, 1 point for a tie, 0 points for a loss) and tie breakers are in following order:
Greater number of points obtained in the group matches between the teams concerned;
Goal difference resulting from the group matches between the teams concerned;
Greater number of goals scored in the group matches between the teams concerned;
Goal difference in all the group matches;
Greater number of goals scored in all the group matches;
Kicks from the penalty mark if only two teams are involved and they are both on the field of play;
Fewer score calculated according to the number of yellow and red cards received in the group matches; (1 point for each yellow card, 3 points for each red card as a consequence of two yellow cards, 3 points for each direct red card, 4 points for each yellow card followed by a direct red card)
Drawing of lots.

Group A

Group B

Knockout stage

Semi-finals

Third place play-off

Final

Statistics

Winner

Individual Awards
The following awards were given for the 2012 AFC Challenge Cup:

Team of the tournament
The team of the tournament – Dream Team in a 4-4-2 formation.

Goalkeeper:  Ri Myong-guk
Defenders:  Ri Kwang-hyok,  Şöhrat Söýünow,  Khaled Mahdi,  Jon Kwang-ik
Midfielders:  Arslanmyrat Amanow,  Guwanç Rejepow,  Pak Nam-chol I,  Jong Il-gwan
Forwards:  Pak Kwang-ryong,  Phil Younghusband
Coach:  Yun Jong-su (North Korea)

Goalscorers
6 goals
 Phil Younghusband

3 goals
 Pak Nam-chol I

2 goals

 Jang Kuk-chol
 Pak Kwang-ryong
 Abdelhamid Abuhabib
 Fahed Attal
 Ángel Guirado
 Arslanmyrat Amanow
 Gahrymanberdi Çoňkaýew

1 goal

 Jang Song-hyok
 Jon Kwang-ik
 Jong Il-gwan
 Ri Chol-myong
 Ri Kwang-hyok
 Hassan Adhuham
 Mohamed Rasheed
 Alaa Atiya
 Ashraf Nu'man
 Houssam Wadi
 Juan Luis Guirado
 Nuriddin Davronov
 Akhtam Khamrakulov
 Aleksey Negmatov
 Guwanç Hangeldiýew
 Ruslan Mingazow
 Berdi Şamyradow
 Elman Tagaýew

1 own goal
 Biraj Maharjan (playing against Turkmenistan)

Post-tournament team ranking
As per statistical convention in football, matches decided in extra time are counted as wins and losses, while matches decided by penalty shoot-outs are counted as draws.

References

External links
AFC Challenge Cup

 
2012
2012 in Asian football
2012
2011–12 in Palestinian football
2011–12 in Indian football
2012 in Tajikistani football
2012 in Nepalese sport
2012 in Philippine football
2012 in North Korean football
2012 in Maldivian football
2012 in Turkmenistani football